André Dae Kim (born December 2, 1996) is a Canadian actor. He is known for his role as Winston Chu in the Canadian television series Degrassi: The Next Generation and Degrassi: Next Class, and as Dylan Edwards in the CBS series Salvation.

Early life and education 
Kim was born in Edmonton and grew up in Mississauga where he joined the drama program at Cawthra Park Secondary School. He attended University of Toronto Mississauga and Sheridan College's joint theatre and drama studies program.

Career 
In 2012, while in grade 10, Kim sent a video audition to producers of Degrassi, which granted him the part of Winston Chu in Degrassi: The Next Generation and then Degrassi: Next Class which premiered in 2016. In 2017, he was nominated for Joey Award for his role in Salvation and for his role in Degrassi: Next Class. Kim was nominated for the Young Entertainer Award in 2017 and 2018 for his role in Degrassi: Next Class.

Filmography

Awards and nominations

References

External links 
 

Living people
1996 births
21st-century Canadian male actors
Canadian male actors of Korean descent
Canadian male film actors
Canadian male television actors